Zamhareer is a place of extreme cold at the bottom of hell in some Islamic sources. It is characterized as being unbearably cold, with blizzards, ice, and snow. Some Islamic exegetes advocate the idea that this term refers to a place in Jahannam or in the grave. Acccording to hadith tradition (Bukhari and Sahih Muslim), Allah allows Jahannam to take two breaths per year, one in summer and one in winter, releasing hell's extreme temperatures upon earth. According to Ibn Abi al-Dunya, when the sinners beg the guardians of hell to leave the fire, they escape to Zamhareer and then beg to go back to the fire, because of it is unbearable cold. Others describe Zamhareer as a pit, where the bones of the damned are scattered.

References

Afterlife places
Jahannam